Nutrisoda (formerly known as airforce Nutrisoda) was the brand name of a nutrient-enhanced soda sold in the United States by the Ardea Beverage Company.  

Nutrisoda contained zero sugar, zero sodium, zero aspartame, and zero to ten calories.  It was sweetened with Sucralose, an artificial sweetener made by chlorinating sucrose.

Origins

Nutrisoda was created in 2002 by Joe Heron, previously the Senior Vice President of Novartis Medical Nutrition, and his wife, Lesley Heron. Nutrisoda was a line of nutrient-enhanced sodas that claimed to provide specific wellness benefits.

In January 2006, Ardea Beverage Co. was purchased by PepsiAmericas, the second largest Pepsi bottler in the world.

Product development

Nutrisoda was reformulated in early 2009 to reduce price ahead of its May 2009 re-launch. The level of nutrients and fortification were reduced significantly, colors were removed from the beverage, and new 12oz(355ml) cans were introduced in order to allow the beverage to be produced in PepsiAmericas plants rather than by third party co-packers. During this reformulation Ardea decided to move forward with four SKUs, down from eight that were previously for sale until early 2009. Flex, Slender, Radiant, and Renew were the flavors no longer being produced, as of May 2009. Nutrisoda also officially dropped airforce from its brand name during this period. A new slogan was created. Rather than "The Good Soda" the slogan was changed to "Healthy / Bubbly" or "Hubbly", which is also the nickname for a hookah pipe. Consumer acceptance was poor and Nutrisoda was no longer sold within a year of the relaunch.

Flavors

There were ultimately four flavors of Nutrisoda containing different combinations of 11 vitamins and nutrients that are marketed as supporting separate aspects of wellness. None contained sugar, aspartame, or sodium, and had zero to five calories.

FOCUS: Black cherry and apple natural flavors. Contains 100 mg of Ginseng extract, 50 mg of amino acid L-Tyrosine, and Vitamin B12, Folic Acid, Biotin, Magnesium, Niacin, Pantothenic acid, Pyridoxine HCL (Vitamin B6), and minerals Zinc and Selenium.
ENERGIZE:  Mandarin and orange natural flavors. Contains 50 mg of Caffeine, 500 mg of Taurine, and Vitamin B12, Folic Acid, Biotin, Magnesium, Niacin, Pantothenic acid, Pyridoxine HCL (Vitamin B6), and minerals Zinc and Selenium. Energize is the only flavor of Nutrisoda to contain caffeine.
CALM: Wild berry and citron natural flavors. Contains 100 mg of Chamomile extract, 10 mg of Choline, and Vitamin B12, Folic Acid, Biotin, Magnesium, Niacin, Pantothenic acid, Pyridoxine HCL (Vitamin B6), and minerals Zinc and Selenium.
IMMUNE: Tangerine and lime natural flavors. Contains 500 mg of the amino acid L-Arginine, 100 mg of Ginseng extract, and Vitamin B12, Folic Acid, Biotin, Magnesium, Niacin, Pantothenic acid, Pyridoxine HCL (Vitamin B6), and minerals Zinc and Selenium.

References

American soft drinks